Rosie was an American pop group from New York, United States. The group existed from 1975 to 1978 and consisted of David Lasley, Lana Marrano and Lynn Pitney, all of whom were cast members and met during of the touring show of "Hair".  Lasley wrote all the songs, mostly with Marrano. 

In 1975 Rosie performed as back-up singers for Genya Ravan at her Reno Sweeney show, where they also performed one of their own songs. Ravan brought the group to Mike Berniker at RCA where they put on a live performance of their songs.

Better Late Than Never 
Rosie released two albums on RCA. "Better Late than Never" was produced by Genya Ravan and Harvey Goldberg, released in 1976 with "Roll Me Through The Rushes" issued as the first single.  The song was arranged by Charles Calello.

Last Dance 
"Last Dance" was produced by Michael Kamen and released in 1977. "The Words Don't Matter" issued as the first single. The album was released on the same day that Elvis Presley died, which shifted RCA's promotion attention away from Last Dance. The song "Out Of Pawn" from Last Dance was covered by Tim Curry.

References 

American pop music groups
American musical trios 
American vocal groups
American soul musical groups
RCA Records artists
Albums produced by Michael Kamen
Blue-eyed soul albums